American singer, songwriter and record producer R. Kelly has released 12 studio albums, 5 compilation albums and 3 collaboration albums. Kelly has sold over 200 million records, making him the most successful R&B male artist of the 1990s and also one of the best selling musical artists of all time. He is listed by Billboard as the most successful R&B/Hip Hop artist of the past 25 years (1985–2010) and also the most successful R&B artist in history.

This is a list of unreleased songs recorded by R. Kelly.

Songs

See also

 List of songs recorded by R. Kelly

References

R. Kelly songs
Kelly, R